The following lists events that happened during 2012 in Turkmenistan.

Events

February
 February 12 - Turkmenistan has a presidential election; incumbent Gurbanguly Berdimuhamedow is re-elected with 97% of the vote.
 February 13 - The President of Turkmenistan, Gurbanguli Berdymukhamedov, wins a new five-year term with 97% of the vote, according to election officials.

December
 December 15 - A census of population and housing begins today.

References

 
Years of the 21st century in Turkmenistan
2010s in Turkmenistan
Turkmenistan
Turkmenistan